Paul Robinette, played by Richard Brooks, is a fictional character who appeared in the TV drama series Law & Order from the pilot episode in 1990 until the final episode of the third season, "Benevolence," in 1993. He is the first of the eight Assistant District Attorneys who have been featured on Law & Order, and the only one who was male. He appeared in 69 episodes.

Character overview
Robinette was born in 1957 and is introduced as having been raised in Harlem and worked his way through law school. He had the chance to work on Wall Street, but turned it down in favor of the Manhattan District Attorney's office, where he felt he could make a difference. He works under Ben Stone (Michael Moriarty). He was mentored as a teenager by Deputy Police Commander William Jefferson (Ron Foster), who inspired him to become a lawyer. In the pilot episode, "Everybody's Favorite Bagman", however, he and Stone discover that Jefferson is corrupt, and that he conspired to murder a city councilman.

In his appearances during the show's first three seasons, Robinette advocates racial equality through equal treatment, including equal punishment; while he abhors racism, he feels no sympathy for Black people who break the law. He insists on being treated as the equal of his white colleagues, without what he feels are added advantages from affirmative action policies. 

Robinette's views on race change throughout the series. In the first season episode "Out of the Half-Light", Stone asks Robinette if he thinks of himself as "a Black lawyer or a lawyer who's Black". Robinette at first considers himself the latter, but by the time he leaves the DA's office and becomes a defense attorney, he thinks of race as a more integral part of his reasons for practicing law.

Departure from show
Robinette leaves the DA's office at the end of the third season, and eventually becomes a defense attorney who represents his clients as victims of institutionalized racism. He is replaced by Claire Kincaid (Jill Hennessy).

Initially, his disappearance from the show was never explained and was not mentioned in either the third season end or fourth season opener. NBC press releases at the time of the character's departure mentioned that Robinette had moved to a Park Avenue law firm. On the 4th season DVD, a deleted scene includes Lt. Anita Van Buren (S. Epatha Merkerson) asking to see Robinette. Stone responds with "Uh, you'll have to take a cab uptown. Park Avenue. Woodward, Martin, and Schwartz."

Guest appearances
Robinette has reappeared on the show three times: once in 1996, 2005 and 2006, as opposing counsel to Stone's successor, Jack McCoy (Sam Waterston). In the 1996 episode "Custody", he defends a black woman who attempted to kidnap her son from his white adoptive parents. In the 2005 episode "Birthright", he defends a nurse accused of performing sterilizations on promiscuous black teenagers whom she deems emotionally unfit to become parents. In the 2006 episode "Fear America", he defends a Muslim accused of murder who killed to cover up his terrorist activities. In that episode, Robinette accuses McCoy and the D.A.'s office of participating in a giant conspiracy to make every Muslim appear to be a terrorist.  However, he maintains a respectful relationship with the DA's office, even sometimes having drinks with his now-opponents.

In 2017, the character appeared in "Uncertainty Principle", an episode of Chicago P.D., which is set in the same fictional universe as Law & Order. In the episode, Robinette travels to Chicago to defend CPD Officer Kevin Atwater (LaRoyce Hawkins) at the request of Sergeant Hank Voight (Jason Beghe), and goes up against Ben Stone's son, Cook County Assistant State's Attorney Peter Stone (Philip Winchester).

References

Law & Order characters
Fictional African-American people
Fictional assistant district attorneys
Fictional characters from New York City
Television characters introduced in 1990
Fictional lawyers
Crossover characters in television
American male characters in television

pt:Paul Robinette